Oddny is a Norwegian and Icelandic feminine given name. Oddný is the variant of the name. It was produced from the combination of two words: oddr meaning “sharp point” and ný meaning “new”. People with the name include:

 Oddny Aleksandersen (born 1942), Norwegian politician
 Oddný Eir (born 1972), Icelandic writer 
 Oddný G. Harðardóttir (born 1957), Icelandic politician

Icelandic feminine given names
Norwegian feminine given names